Motilal Chimanlal Setalvad (c. 1884 – 1974) was an eminent Indian jurist, who became the first and longest serving Attorney General for India (1950–1963). He also remained the Chairman of the first Law Commission of India  (1955–1958), which has mandated for legal reform in the country by Government of India. He became the first Chairman of the Bar Council of India in 1961.

He was awarded the Padma Vibhushan, India's second highest civilian honour by Government of India in 1957.

Biography
The son of noted lawyer Sir Chimanlal Harilal Setalvad, M. C. Setalvad was brought up in Bombay. He studied at Government Law College, Mumbai.

He started practicing law in Bombay and eventually became Advocate General of Bombay and Attorney General for India in 1950, in the formative years of Government of India, under Jawaharlal Nehru.

He appeared for the government in a host of important and, at times, controversial cases. He was also involved with the Radcliffe Tribunal for demarcation of the India-Pakistan border and several UN proceedings on Kashmir. He chaired the first Law Commission of independent India, in which capacity he not just advised the government on crucial reforms and legislation but also created a framework for the Commission’s future functioning.

He died in 1974.

Personal life
His son, Atul Setalvad (25 October 1933 - 22 July 2010) was a Mumbai-based lawyer and his daughter-in-law Sita Setalvad, a rural crafts exponent, while his granddaughter, Teesta Setalvad, is an activist and journalist.

Bibliography
 My life; law and other things, 1970.

References

External links
 M. C.  Setalvad, Biography
 Of reform and resistance Indian Express

20th-century Indian lawyers
1880s births
1974 deaths
Indian autobiographers
Attorneys General of India
Recipients of the Padma Vibhushan in public affairs
Nominated members of the Rajya Sabha
19th-century Indian lawyers
20th-century Indian biographers
20th-century Indian male writers

mr:मोतीलाल चिमणलाल सेटलवाड